J. Clarke Richardson Collegiate is a secondary school in Ajax, Ontario, Canada. J. Clarke Richardson is run under the Durham District School Board. Richardson offers a wide range of academic and co-curricular activities for students, such as the enriched specialist high skills major program, laptop program and other activities that aid student success.

Richardson Collegiate laptop program is now a 'bring your own technology' program where students use appropriate laptops and tablets, wireless network access and cloud computing as integral parts of their learning.

Academic co-curricular activities include Robotics, DECA, math club, science club, and dance club.

Leadership co-curricular activities include Student Government, Richardson Athletic Council, Music Council, The Diaspora Collective, South Asian club, Culture of Richardson, and CLIC (Character Education group)

Name
The school's name originates from a well known local educator. He was the principal at Pickering High School (Ajax) in 1958, he was the Superintendent of the Pickering secondary schools, and in 1969, he was the Superintendent of Operations for the new Ontario county board, which included all of the Ajax high schools. Richardson was well respected by colleagues and students and was key in making it possible for students to further their education by helping financially.

Building
J. Clarke Richardson Collegiate was opened in September 2002. It is a part of a project that combines two high schools, J. Clarke of the Durham District School Board and Notre Dame Catholic Secondary of the Durham Catholic District School Board. The schools are separated by a shared cafeteria and theatre on the inside, directly in the middle of both schools. It also shares a main sports field east of the building, all of which is on the same property. J. Clarke occupies the south half of the complex and Notre Dame (ND) occupies the north half. J. Clarke owns a state-of-the-art kitchen for its culinary program and provides lunch for both J. Clarke and ND.

Sports
Athletic co-curricular activities include basketball, soccer, ice hockey, football, volleyball, track and field, field hockey, badminton, tennis, baseball and cross-country running. Cricket is also played by some students in J. Clarke Richardson. The Richardson teams are known as the Richardson Storm.

In recent years, J Clarke Richardson has become known as a dominant basketball school and have consistently been ranked in the top 10 basketball schools in the GTA. They have participated in back-to-back LOSSA championships, one of which they won. They competed the OFSAA basketball tournament in the years 2010 and 2011 respectively; in 2011 they finished fourth. In 2010, J. Clarke's basketball was once ranked number 1 in the GTA and all of Canada.

The 2014 robotics won regional competition GTR west and progressed to the world robotics championship in St.Louis, Missouri.

The school has also done well in track and field, particularly in the 100 m sprinting, in which they hold the senior boys record in Central Ontario with a time of 10.73 s (2011).

J. Clarke has also sent an alumnus to the United States on Division 1 NCAA soccer scholarships.

The NFL's New York Jets Nathan Shepherd, was the only Canadian 2018 NFL Draft pick and graduate of J Clarke Richardson.

Other
J. Clarke Richardson is an award winner for their technology education an integration program. From its inception, JCR has implemented information literacy skills across its curriculum program. The goals of the ICT programs are to ensure that technology is used to improve student learning and to guarantee that all students graduate high school with the basics about how to use technology. J Clarke’s EcoTeam has created and fund-raised for the production of an outdoor classroom. This classroom provides an opportunity for students to learn and engage in hands-on activities. This space is available for all classes, in all of the subjects, and depending on the subject there are many different activities.

JCR's main feeder schools are:
 Applecroft Public School
 DaVinci Public School
 Dr. Roberta Bondar Public School
 Lester B. Pearson Public School
 Nottingham Public School
 Romeo Dallaire Public School
 Terry Fox Public School
 Valley View Public School
 Viola Desmond Public School

JCR's overflow feeder schools are:
 Lincoln Alexander Public School
 Westney Heights Public School

See also
 List of high schools in Ontario

References

External links
 *
 DurhamRegion.com - J. Clarke Richardson
 J..ca Eye on the Storm, J. Clarke Richardson's student newspaper
 [www.hooptowngta.com]

High schools in the Regional Municipality of Durham
Ajax, Ontario
2002 establishments in Ontario
Educational institutions established in 2002